Mikhail Valeryevich Kokorich is a Russian physicist and entrepreneur. He has founded, in Russia, the USA, and Europe, several companies active in aerospace technologies. He is best known as a founder of Destinus, developing a high-speed aircraft, a hybrid between an airplane and a rocket. Previously, Mikhail Kokorich has founded and developed several companies in the space industry, including Momentus, which was listed on the NASDAQ in the summer of 2021.

Early life and education 
Kokorich grew up in Siberia. He studied in the Specialized Educational Scientific Center and the Department of Physics of NSU. He finished Stanford Executive Program, and he holds an MBA degree from the Moscow School of Management.

Career 

He founded his first company, Dauria, as a student in 1997. This company specialized in industrial water treatment. Dauria provided mining and construction companies with blasting services and supplied chemical reagents for power, water treatment, and wood processing.

Later, he started founding companies that were focused on space and technology, such as Dauria Aerospace, Astro Digital, Momentus Space and Destinus.

In 2004, Kokorich founded Chudodom, a domestic merchandise retail stores chain. In 2009 Chudodom merged with Lipetsk-based competitor Yuterra, forming the largest domestic merchandise company in Eastern Europe. In 2013, Kokorich sold his shares in the merged company to other shareholders.

In 2010, Kokorich bought Technosila, one of the largest electronics and household appliance chains, after the 2008 crisis. In 2012, after financial recovery and restructuring, Kokorich sold Technosila to develop his new company, Dauria Aerospace 

In 2011, Kokorich founded Dauria Aerospace, with headquarters in Munich and subsidiaries in Mountain View and Moscow. In 2013, the company raised $20 million from the I2BF Global Ventures. Between 2014 and 2017, the company launched five satellites. In 2015, all of Dauria Aerospace's activities outside of Russia were halted due to the deteriorating investment climate and the geopolitical situation. Kokorich left Dauria Aerospace in the same year and co-founded Astro Digital, developing satellites for DARPA and commercial clients.

The Aerospace Adventure

Momentus Space 
In 2017, Kokorich founded space transportation company Momentus in Santa Clara, California, and he has authored many of the company's patents. Momentus became one of Y Combinator's most successful alumni, winning NASA iTech Prize in 2019. Momentus raised privately $143 million and went public in August 2021, raising $247 million in an IPO. 

In January 2021, Momentus Space tried to go public on the NASDAQ exchange, but the IPO of Momentus Space was delayed due to a conflict with U.S. regulators: Mikhail Kokorich and Lev Hasis, being citizens of Russia, which is a "geopolitical rival", and under the U.S. national security law they are prohibited access to the technology used by Momentus, despite the fact that Kokorich is the developer of most of them. 

In January 2021, Kokorich was forced to resign as CEO and member of Momentus' board due to pressure from the U.S. Department of Defense because of his Russian nationality.  

In August 2021, the SEC accused the company and managers, including Kokorich, of misleading investors. Kokorich disagreed with the accusations and stated that he was a victim of the misapplication of US policy against Russian entrepreneurs. The new CEO of Momentus Space was succeeded by John Rood, former U.S. defense official.

Destinus 
In 2021, Kokorich moved to Switzerland and founded Destinus to develop hydrogen-powered hyperplanes - hybrids between a rocket and an airplane for cargo transportation between continents. Destinus is headquartered in the canton of Vaud and has offices in Munich, Madrid, and Toulouse. In November 2021, first prototype – "Jungfrau30" - made its maiden flight. The purpose of this test was to see how the hypersonic flight geometry would perform at low speeds during the critical takeoff and landing phases.

Political position 
In 2022 Kokorich condemned Russian invasion of Ukraine, he is one of the prominent Russians constituting the Anti-War Committee.

Personal life 

Married.

References 

1976 births
Living people
Russian activists against the 2022 Russian invasion of Ukraine
Russian businesspeople in the United States
Russian emigrants to the United States
Russian aerospace engineers